Sane Seven is a working name of a professional portrait and advertising photography duo in the UK consisting of artist and photographer Viktorija Grigorjevaite and Dr. Marius Janciauskas. The team formed in June 2014 in Liverpool.

Career
Before the collaborative partnership, Grigorjevaite was a Creative Director at The Collective magazine, visiting lecturer of a Fashion and Communication Course at John Moores University, and Board Member of Trustees at The Merseyside Youth Association. Janciauskas was completing his PhD in Psychology after originally studying photography in Lithuania where he worked and studied under Tomas Kauneckas in Ciklopas (Cyclopes), one of the leading photography studios in the Baltic states. Both Grigorjevaite and Janciauskas were from Lithuania and collaborated to form Sane Seven. 

After joining together as a team, the duo became known for their creative portraits. In 2016 they held an exhibition during the International Festival for Business that featured unconventional portraits of business leaders, philanthropists and entrepreneurs including Terry Leahy; Michael Bibby; The Earl of Derby; and others. The duo won 2017 MIFA Award for Advertising Photographer of the Year. In 2021, Sane Seven won Gold in a professional portrait photography category at the New York Photography Awards.

In 2017, the duo published a book about business success aimed at inspiring young entrepreneurs titled Secrets of Success: None of Us Are Superman. The book won a silver prize at the MIFA awards.

References 

British photography organisations